The Doncaster Stallions also known as the Doncaster Dragons were a motorcycle speedway team who operated from Doncaster Greyhound Track, York Road, Doncaster for two seasons in 1969 to 1970.

History
The speedway team spent both seasons in British League Division Two. During the 1969 British League Division Two season they finished 12th. For their second season they were known as Doncaster Dragons and they finished 15th from 17 teams in the 1970 British League Division Two season.

In 1971, all riders were transferred to the Birmingham Brummies.

Season summary

References 

Defunct British speedway teams